Michael Russell (born 16 December 1949) is a Bahamian sailor. He competed in the Finn event at the 1976 Summer Olympics.

References

External links
 

1949 births
Living people
Bahamian male sailors (sport)
Olympic sailors of the Bahamas
Sailors at the 1976 Summer Olympics – Finn
Place of birth missing (living people)